Toton Lane is a tram stop and park and ride site on the Nottingham Express Transit network, serving the suburb of Chilwell and town of Stapleford, Broxtowe in Nottinghamshire, England.

History 
The stop opened on 25 August 2015, following the opening of the second phase of the network from Station Street, with branches to Clifton South and Toton Lane.

The stop comprises a pair of side platforms flanking the twin terminal tracks, with one of the platforms being long enough to accommodate, if necessary, two trams. It is situated to the west of Chilwell, north of Toton, and south of Stapleford, and is just  along the Stapleford bypass (A52) from junction 25 of the M1 motorway. The park and ride site has a capacity of 1,400 cars. There is also an interchange with local bus services, and a kiosk.

Services 
As of January 2022, services operate at a 7–15 minute frequency between Hucknall and Toton Lane.

Rolling stock used: Alstom Citadis and Bombardier Incentro

Gallery

References

External links
 

Nottingham Express Transit stops
Transport in the Borough of Broxtowe
Railway stations in Great Britain opened in 2015